Informatik formerly known as Informätik is an electro-industrial/futurepop duo from Boston that was formed in 1993 and is represented by Metropolis Records in the US and Dependent Records in Europe. The band were repeat contributors to the "Mind/Body" compilation series organized by participants of the rec.music.industrial Usenet group in the mid-nineties. Both members are vegans.

Discography 
 1995 Direct Memory Access
 1997 Direct Memory Access v2.0
 1998 Syntax 2002 Nymphomatik 2004 Re:Vision 2008 Beyond 2009 Come Together (digital single) 2009 Arena 2013 How Long (digital single) 2013 Playing With Fire 2020 Impulse Ambient''

References

External links
 Informatik on Discogs
 Informatik details on Metropolis Records site
 Official Homepage

Musical groups from Boston
Musical groups from San Francisco
Electro-industrial music groups
Electronic music groups from Massachusetts
Electronic music duos
Metropolis Records artists
Dependent Records artists